Jonathan Michael Majors (born September 7, 1989) is an American actor. He first rose to prominence after starring in the independent feature film The Last Black Man in San Francisco (2019), and in 2020 garnered wider notice for starring in the HBO television series Lovecraft Country, for which he received a Primetime Emmy Award nomination. He has also portrayed Nat Love in the western The Harder They Fall (2021) and Jesse L. Brown in the war film Devotion (2022). Since 2021, he began starring in the Marvel Cinematic Universe as different versions of the character Kang the Conqueror.

Early life 
Majors was born in Santa Barbara County, California, and spent his early years living with his family—his mother, a pastor, and his older sister and younger brother—on the Vandenberg military base, due to his father being in the US Air Force. Majors said in 2020 that, "Our father, who loved us dearly, just kind of disappeared one day ... and he resurfaced 17 years later." Majors has since reconnected with his father. The family soon moved to Dallas, Texas. Majors subsequently lived in Georgetown, Texas, outside of Austin, Texas, and later grew up in Cedar Hill, Texas. After transferring from Cedar Hill High School, he graduated from Duncanville High School in 2008.

Majors had a difficult childhood, growing up with recently-released criminals such as drug dealers or murderers for neighbors who wore ankle monitors. Due to his neighbours having both negative and positive values, Majors felt some moral complexity within him. As a teenager, Majors faced numerous struggles: he was arrested for shoplifting, suspended from high school for getting into a fight and at one point he lived in his car while working two jobs to make ends meet after being kicked out of his house. He eventually found a "safe space" in the world of theatre, where he found some solace and joined after watching Christopher Nolan's The Dark Knight, in which he felt Heath Ledger's performance as the Joker to resemble the criminals with moralistic dualities he grew up with for his complexity of good and evil, leading him to become an actor so he could inspire others like Ledger did to him.

Majors studied for his bachelor's degree at the University of North Carolina School of the Arts, and later attended the Yale School of Drama; he graduated with an MFA degree in 2016.

Career 
Majors secured his first onscreen role in the ABC miniseries When We Rise while still a student at Yale. In the series, Majors portrayed real-life gay activist Ken Jones; as part of his research for the role, he met with Jones before playing him.

That same year, Majors appeared in his first feature film role as Corporal Henry Woodson in the revisionist Western film Hostiles, written and directed by Scott Cooper. The film had its world premiere at the Telluride Film Festival on September 2, 2017. It was also screened at the Toronto International Film Festival on September 10, 2017. More roles followed, in the 2018 films White Boy Rick and Out of Blue. Both of these films screened at the 2018 Toronto International Film Festival, with the latter competing for the Platform Prize.

In 2019, Majors rose to prominence after starring in Joe Talbot's critically acclaimed independent feature film The Last Black Man in San Francisco, for which he received an Independent Spirit Award nomination. The film had its world premiere at the Sundance Film Festival on January 26, 2019. It was released by A24 in the United States on June 7, 2019. Former President of the United States Barack Obama rated it as one of the best films of 2019. Majors's performance was praised by critics: Manohla Dargis of The New York Times called his performance "a mournful heartbreaker", while Rolling Stone described his turn as "both deeply sensitive and charmingly left-of-center".

Majors also appeared in three other 2019 film releases: Captive State, Gully, and Jungleland.

In 2020, Majors starred alongside Chadwick Boseman and Delroy Lindo in Spike Lee's war drama film Da 5 Bloods, which was released on Netflix. That year, he also garnered wider notice for portraying Atticus Freeman in the HBO television series Lovecraft Country. His performance in Lovecraft Country was favorably reviewed by critics; Vogue dubbed him "the emotional core of the show". 

Majors debuted in the Marvel Cinematic Universe Disney+ series Loki as "He Who Remains". In 2021, Majors starred as the lead actor in Jeymes Samuel's directorial debut film The Harder They Fall, acting alongside Idris Elba, Zazie Beetz, Regina King and Delroy Lindo. In 2023, he starred in Magazine Dreams and Creed III as Damian 'Dame' Anderson.

He portrayed Kang the Conqueror and several other variants of the character in Ant-Man and the Wasp: Quantumania.

In 2023, Majors confirmed he will be playing Dennis Rodman in Phil Lord & Chris Miller's 48 Hours in Las Vegas.

Personal life 
Majors has one child, a daughter.

Filmography

Film

Television

Awards

References

External links

 

1989 births
21st-century American male actors
African-American male actors
American male film actors
American male television actors
Living people
Male actors from California
Male actors from Dallas
People from Santa Barbara County, California
University of North Carolina School of the Arts alumni
Yale School of Drama alumni
21st-century African-American people
20th-century African-American people